Two-time defending champion Roger Federer clinched a third successive success at the event, defeating Ivan Ljubičić 6–1, 6–7(6–8), 6–3, in the final.

Seeds

Draw

Finals

Top half

Bottom half

External links
Main draw
Qualifying draw

2005 Dubai Tennis Championships
Dubai Tennis Championships - Men's Singles